World Wide Funk is the 15th studio album by former Parliament-Funkadelic bassist Bootsy Collins. The album was released on October 26, 2017—Collins' 66th birthday—by Mascot Records and was made available on CD, 180G "Splatter" vinyl, and digital download. The album features diverse musical collaborations with artists such as Stanley Clarke, Victor Wooten, Chuck D, Big Daddy Kane, Doug E. Fresh, Eric Gales, Musiq Soulchild, Buckethead, Dennis Chambers, Kali Uchis, and the late P-Funk keyboardist, Bernie Worrell.

Track listing

Charts

External links
 https://www.npr.org/2017/10/19/558374990/first-listen-bootsy-collins-world-wide-funk

References

2017 albums
Bootsy Collins albums